The South Australian Railways O Class (2nd) locomotive was a  built by Robert Stephenson and Company in 1868 for the Launceston and Western Railway Company (now known as the Western Line). It entered service with the South Australian Railways in 1912 and was cut up in 1930.

History
This locomotive (No. 1) was in service with another 4-4-0 tank engine for the opening of the line on the 10th of February 1871. When the Tasmanian Government took over the line in October 1873, this locomotive became a member of their A class. In 1888, No. 1 was sold to a private company in Victoria for use between mines at Woolamai and a jetty at Queensferry. Shortly after, it was put into storage until 1910. It was then sold to Smith and Timms for use on the construction of the railway line to Angaston from Gawler in South Australia. The side tanks were removed, which left the locomotive with only a small tank. It was supplemented with a small four wheeled tank which was coupled to the engine. 

Once construction was completed on the Gawler to Angaston line, the contractors sold locomotive No. 1 to the South Australian Railways in February 1912 as No. 204. No. 204 eventually became classed as the second O on the SAR network between 1918 and 1919. The O classes' service on the SAR mainly consisted of shunting at Mile End and Port Adelaide, during which it got a boiler from a Q class locomotive via a rebuild at Islington Railway Workshops.

References

A
Broad gauge locomotives in Australia
Robert Stephenson and Company locomotives
4-4-0WT locomotives  
Scrapped locomotives